The New South Wales Department of Education, a department of the Government of New South Wales, is responsible for the delivery and co-ordination of early childhood, primary school, secondary school, vocational education, adult, migrant and higher education in the state of New South Wales, Australia.

The department was previous known as the Department of Education and Training (DET) between December 1997 and April 2011, and the Department of Education and Communities (DEC) between April 2011 and July 2015.

Structure 

The head of the department is its secretary, presently Georgina Harrisson. The secretary reports to the Minister for Education and Early Learning, currently The Hon. Sarah Mitchell ; supported by the Minister for Skills and Training, currently The Hon. Alister Henskens . Ultimately the ministers are responsible to the Parliament of New South Wales.

With a budget of more than A$8 billion, and over 2,240 schools with a total enrolment of almost one million students, the department represents roughly one-quarter of the State's total budget each year.

Departmental leadership

History 
In 1957 a committee was appointed to survey secondary education in New South Wales to survey and report on the provision of full-time education for adolescents. The resulting report was known as the Wyndham Report.

in 1974, the Australian Capital Territory Schools Authority took over responsibility for nearly 60 government schools that were previously under the control of New South Wales.

Agencies administered
 List of government schools in New South Wales
 List of Government schools in New South Wales: A–F
 List of Government schools in New South Wales: G–P
 List of Government schools in New South Wales: Q–Z
TAFE NSW

See also 

 Department of Education Building
 Commonwealth (Federal) Department of Education, Employment and Workplace Relations

References

External links
NSW Department of Education webpage
Staff and Student Portal

Education and Communities

New South Wales